Typology  in Christian theology and biblical exegesis is a doctrine or theory concerning the relationship of the Old Testament to the New Testament.   Events, persons, or statements in the Old Testament are seen as types prefiguring or superseded by antitypes, events or aspects of Christ or his revelation described in the New Testament. For example, Jonah may be seen as the type of Christ in that he emerged from the fish's belly and thus appeared to rise from death.  

In the fullest version of the theory of typology, the whole purpose of the Old Testament is viewed as merely the provision of types for Christ, the antitype or fulfillment. The theory began in the Early Church, was at its most influential in the High Middle Ages, and continued to be popular, especially in Calvinism, after the Protestant Reformation, but in subsequent periods has been given less emphasis. In 19th century German protestantism, typological interpretation was distinguished from rectilinear interpretation of prophecy. The former was associated with Hegelian theologians and the latter with Kantian analyticity. Several groups favoring typology today include the Christian Brethren beginning in the 19th century, where typology was much favoured and the subject of numerous books and the Wisconsin Evangelical Lutheran Synod. 

Notably, in the Eastern Orthodox Church, typology is still a common and frequent exegetical tool, mainly due to that church's great emphasis on continuity in doctrinal presentation through all historical periods. Typology was frequently used in early Christian art, where type and antitype would be depicted in contrasting positions.

The usage of the terminology has expanded into the secular sphere; for example, "Geoffrey de Montbray (d.1093), Bishop of Coutances, a right-hand man of William the Conqueror, was a type of the great feudal prelate, warrior and administrator".

Etymology
The term is derived from the Greek noun τύπος (typos), "a blow, hitting, stamp", and thus the figure or impression made on a coin by such action; that is, an image, figure, or statue of a man; also an original pattern, model, or mould. To this is prefixed the Greek preposition ἀντί anti, meaning opposite, corresponding.

Origin of the theory
Christian typology begins in the New Testament itself. For example, Paul in Romans 5:14 calls Adam "a type [τύπος] of the one who was to come" — i.e., a type of Christ. He contrasts Adam and Christ both in Romans 5 and in 1 Corinthians 15. The author of the First Epistle of Peter uses the term ἀντίτυπον (antitypon) to refer to baptism. There are also typological concepts in pre-Pauline strata of the New Testament.

The early Christians, in considering the Old Testament, needed to decide what its role and purpose was for them, given that Christian revelation and the New Covenant might be considered to have superseded it, and many specific Old Testament rules and requirements were no longer being followed from books such as  Leviticus dealing with Expounding of the Law.  One purpose of the Old Testament for Christians was to demonstrate that the Ministry of Jesus and Christ's first coming had been prophesied and foreseen, and the Gospels indeed contain many Old Testament prophecies fulfilled by Christ and quotations from the Old Testament which explicitly and implicitly link Jesus to Old Testament prophecies. Typology greatly extended the number of these links by adding others based on the similarity of Old Testament actions or situations to an aspect of Christ.

Typology is also a theory of history, seeing the whole story of the Jewish and Christian peoples as shaped by God, with events within the story acting as symbols for later events. In this role, God is often compared to a writer, using actual events instead of fiction to shape his narrative. The most famous form of this is the three-fold Hegelian dialectic pattern, although it is also used in other applications besides history.

Development of typology

The system of Medieval allegory began in the Early Church as a method for synthesizing the seeming discontinuities between the Hebrew Bible (Old Testament) and the New Testament. The Church studied both testaments and saw each as equally inspired by God, yet the Old Testament contained discontinuities for Christians such as the Jewish kosher laws and the requirement for male circumcision.  This therefore encouraged seeing at least parts of the Old Testament not as a literal account but as an allegory or foreshadowing of the events of the New Testament, and in particular examining how the events of the Old Testament related to the events of Christ's life.  Most theorists believed in the literal truth of the Old Testament accounts, but regarded the events described as shaped by God to provide types foreshadowing Christ. Others regarded some parts of the Bible as essentially allegorical; however, the typological relationships remained the same whichever view was taken. Paul the Apostle states the doctrine in Colossians 2:16–17: "Therefore do not let anyone judge you by what you eat or drink, or with regard to a religious festival, a New Moon celebration or a sabbath day. These are a shadow of the things that were to come; the reality, however, is found in Christ." The idea also finds expression in the Letter to the Hebrews.

The development of this systematic view of the Hebrew Bible was influenced by the thought of the Hellenistic Jewish world centered in Alexandria, where Jewish philosopher Philo (c. 20 BC – c. 50 AD) and others viewed Scripture in philosophical terms (contemporary Greek literary theory highlighted foreshadowing as a literary device) as essentially an allegory, using Hellenistic Platonic concepts. Origen (184/185253/254) Christianised the system, and figures including Hilary of Poitiers (c. 300c. 368) and Ambrose (c. 340397) spread it.  Saint Augustine (345–430) recalled often hearing Ambrose say that "the letter kills but the spirit gives life", and Augustine in turn became a hugely influential proponent of the system, though also insisting on the literal historical truth of the Bible. Isidore of Seville (c. 560–636) and Rabanus Maurus (c. 780–856) became influential as summarizers and compilers of works setting out standardized interpretations of correspondences and their meanings.

Jewish typological thought continued to develop in Rabbinic literature, including the Kabbalah, with concepts such as the Pardes, the four approaches to a biblical text.

Typology frequently emerged in art; many typological pairings appear in sculpture on cathedrals and churches and in other media.  Popular illustrated works expounding typological couplings were among the commonest books of the late Middle Ages, as illuminated manuscripts, blockbooks, and incunabula (early printed books).  The Speculum Humanae Salvationis and the Biblia pauperum became the two most successful compilations.

Example of Jonah
The story of Jonah and the fish in the Old Testament offers an example of typology. In the Old Testament Book of Jonah, Jonah told his shipmates to throw him overboard, explaining that God's wrath would pass if Jonah were sacrificed, and that the sea would become calm. Jonah then spent three days and three nights in the belly of a great fish before it spat him up onto dry land.

Typological interpretation of this story holds that it prefigures Christ's burial and resurrection. The stomach of the fish represented Christ's tomb; as Jonah exited from the fish after three days and three nights, so did Christ rise from His tomb on the third day.  In the New Testament, Jesus invokes Jonah in the manner of a type: "As the crowds increased, Jesus said, 'This is a wicked generation. It asks for a miraculous sign, but none will be given it except the sign of Jonah.'"  (see also). In , Jonah called the belly of the fish "She'ol", the land of the dead (translated as "the grave" in the NIV Bible).

Thus, when one finds an allusion to Jonah in Medieval art or in Medieval literature, it usually represents an allegory for the burial and resurrection of Christ. Other common typological allegories entail the four major Old Testament prophets Isaiah, Jeremiah, Ezekiel, and Daniel prefiguring the four Evangelists Matthew, Mark, Luke, and John, or the twelve tribes of Israel foreshadowing the twelve apostles. Commentators could find countless numbers of analogies between stories of the Old Testament and the New; modern typologists prefer to limit themselves to considering typological relationships that they find sanctioned in the New Testament itself, as in the example of Jonah above.

Other Old Testament examples

Offering of Isaac
Genesis Chapter 22 brings us the story of the preempted offering of Isaac. God asks Abraham to offer his son Isaac to Him, cited as foreshadowing the crucifixion of Jesus. Isaac asks his father, “Where is the lamb for the burnt offering”, and Abraham prophesies, "God himself will provide the lamb for the burnt offering, my son." And indeed, a ram caught by its horns awaits them, which is also seen as a type for Christ, the lamb that God provides for sacrifice, crowned by thorns.

Joseph
Genesis Chapters 37–50 have the story of Joseph in Egypt, and Joseph is commonly cited as a Christ type. Joseph is a very special son to his father. From his father’s perspective, Joseph dies and then comes back to life as the ruler of Egypt. Joseph’s brothers deceive their father by dipping his coat in the blood of a sacrificed goat (Genesis 37:31).  Later, Joseph’s father finds that Joseph is alive and is the ruler of Egypt who saves the world from a great famine. Other parallels between Joseph and Jesus include:
 both are rejected by their own people
 both became servants
 both are betrayed for silver
 both are falsely accused and face false witnesses
 both attain stations at the "right hand" of the respective thrones (Joseph at Pharaoh's throne and Christ at the throne of God)
Joseph was 30 years old when he stood before Pharaoh, and Jesus was about the same age, according to the Bible, when he began his ministry
Money and goods were not able to save the people in time of famine, they had to sell themselves, the same notions are discussed throughout the New Testament.  
 both provided for the salvation of gentiles,  (Joseph provided a physical salvation in preparing for the famine, while Christ provided the deeper spiritual salvation)
 Joseph married an Egyptian wife, bringing her into the Abrahamic lineage; Christ's relationship with the church is also described in marriage terms in the New Testament
A direct parallel with Joseph ruling over all of Egypt, and that only Pharaoh would be greater in the throne (Genesis 41:40) is repeated in 1 Corinthians 15:27 with regards to Jesus 
Both suffered greatly, and through patience and humbleness were exalted greatly by God, who gave in abundance all things over time.

Moses
Moses, like Joseph and Jonah, undergoes a symbolic death and resurrection. Moses is placed in a basket and floated down the Nile river, and then is drawn out of the Nile to be adopted as a prince (floating the body down the Nile river was also part of an Egyptian funerary ritual for royalty).

While in the wilderness, Moses put a brazen serpent on a pole which would heal anyone bitten by a snake, provided that the person looked at it (Numbers 21:8). Jesus proclaimed that the serpent was a type of Himself: "as Moses lifted up the serpent in the wilderness, even so must the Son of man be lifted up" (John 3:14).

In the battle with the Amalekites at Rephidim, Exodus 17:11 states that "as long as Moses held up his hands, the Israelites were winning, but whenever he lowered his hands, the Amalekites were winning." Commentators interpret Moses' raised hands as a type of Jesus' raised hands upon the Cross for, when Jesus' hands were raised as He died, a figurative battle was waged with sin, the end result being victory – that "all will be made alive" (1 Cor. 15:22).

Inanimate types
Other types were found in aspects of the Old Testament less tied to specific events.  The Jewish holidays also have typological fulfillment in the life of Christ.  The Last Supper was a Passover meal.  Furthermore, many people see the Spring Feasts as types of what Christ accomplished in his first advent and the Fall Feasts as types of what Christ will accomplish in his second advent.

The Jewish Tabernacle is commonly seen as a series of complex types of Jesus Christ. For example, Jesus describes himself as "the door" and the only "way" to God, represented in the single, wide gate to the tabernacle court; the various layers of coverings over the tabernacle represent Christ's godliness (in the intricately woven inner covering) and his humanity (in the dull colouring of the outside covering).  The Showbread prepared in the Temple of Jerusalem is also seen as a type for Christ.

Post-biblical usage
As Erich Auerbach points out in his essay "Figura", typological (figural) interpretation co-existed alongside allegorical and symbolic-mythical forms of interpretation. But it was typology that was most influential as Christianity spread in late Mediterranean cultures, as well as in the North and Western European cultures. Auerbach notes that it was the predominant method of understanding the Hebrew scriptures until after the Reformation—that is, that the Hebrew texts were not understood as Jewish history and law but were instead interpreted "as figura rerum or phenomenal prophecy, as a prefiguration of Christ". Typological interpretation was a key element of Medieval realism, but remained important in Europe "up to the eighteenth century".

Further, typology was extended beyond interpretations of the Hebrew scriptures and applied to post-biblical events, seeing them as "not the ultimate fulfillment, but [...] a promise of the end of time and the true kingdom of God." Thus, the Puritans interpreted their own history typologically:

In this way, the Puritans applied typology both to themselves as a group and to the progress of the individual souls: 

Typology also became important as a literary device, in which both historical and literary characters become prefigurations of later historical or literary characters.

Intrinsic vs. extrinsic typology
Exegetical professor  (1842-1913) separated biblical typology into two categories. He distinguished extrinsic or external typology as separate from the meaning of the text and its original meaning - rather, it is applied to the topic by the reader. Stöckhardt saw intrinsic or internal typology as embedded within the meaning of the text itself. Although he rejected the possibility of intrinsic typology because it would violate the doctrine of the clarity of scripture, most typologists either do not make this distinction or do not reject typology internal to the text. Stöckhardt's position against intrinsic typology is related to the position that all Messianic prophecies are rectilinear as opposed to typological.

Typology and narrative criticism
Typology is also used by narrative critics to describe the type of time in which an event or happening takes place. Mark Allan Powell separates chronological time from typological time. Whereas chronological time refers to the time of action, typological time refers to the “kind of time” of an action. Typological settings may be symbolic.

See also
 Anagoge
Foreshadowing
 Correspondence (theology) – typology of Emanuel Swedenborg.
 Peter Leithart – typologist
 Parallelomania, concerning the overuse of typology
 Supersessionism
 Tropological reading

References

Further reading
 Fairbairn, Patrick. The Typology of Scripture. Edinburgh: T. & T. Clark, 1847.
 Goppelt, Leonhardt. Typos: The Typology Interpretation of the Old Testament in the New. Grand Rapids: Eerdmans, 1982.
 Martens, Peter. "Revisiting the Allegory/Typology Distinction: The Case of Origen." Journal of Early Christian Studies 16 (2008): 283–317.

External links
Berkeley, Set of woodcut typological illustrations to the Speculum Humanae Salvationis
Online book Patrick Fairbairn The Typology of Scripture, 1859
Catholic Encyclopedia: Types in Scripture
Jewish Encyclopedia: ALLEGORICAL INTERPRETATION
Puritan typology, Donna M. Campbell, Washington State University
 Nicholas Lunn, "Allusions to the Joseph Narrative in the Synoptic Gospels and Acts" (2012) 

Biblical exegesis
Christian theology of the Bible
Christian iconography
Christian terminology